Wellington railway station was a former railway station located in  Wellington in Somerset on the Bristol–Exeter line. It served the town between 1843 and 1964, when it was closed as part of the Beeching cuts. In recent years proposals to reopen the station have been advanced. It was known as Wellington (Somerset) to distinguish it from Wellington Station in Shropshire.

History
A station was opened at Wellington when the line reached the town on 1 May 1843. Initially the next station west Beam Bridge functioned as the terminus of the line, until the route to Exeter was completed in 1844. Beam Bridge then closed and Burlescombe, just across the border in Devon, became the next station west. Heading eastwards the next station was Norton Fitzwarren followed by Taunton.

It was a typical Brunel design but was rebuilt in 1932 when two loop lines were put in. This entailed the platforms being moved back to accommodate the widened lines. These platforms are clearly visible and a goods shed still stands on the east side of the line at the Taunton end of the station, although the station closed on 5 October 1964.

Wellington was an important station as it stood at the foot of a steep incline. Banking locomotives were kept here, ready to assist heavy westbound trains up to Whiteball Tunnel.

References

Bibliography
 
 Jenkins, Stanley C. & Loader, Martin. The Great Western Railway Volume Two Bristol to Plymouth. Amberley Publishing, 2014.
 MacDermot, Edward Terence. History of the Great Western Railway, Volume 2. I. Allan, 1964.

Disused railway stations in Somerset
Former Great Western Railway stations
Railway stations in Great Britain opened in 1843
Railway stations in Great Britain closed in 1964
1843 establishments in England
Beeching closures in England
Wellington, Somerset